Tehzeeb-e-Niswan was an Islamic weekly magazine for women, started by Sayyid Mumtaz Ali along with his wife Muhammadi Begum in 1898. It is regarded as the pioneering work on women rights in Islam. It was published from Lahore between 1898 and 1949.

History
Named Tehzeeb-e-Niswan by Syed Ahmad Khan, this women rights magazine was started by Sayyid Mumtaz Ali along with his wife Muhammadi Begum in 1898. Its first issue was published on 1 July 1898. It started with eight pages and subsequently had 10 pages, and finally sixteen pages.

Mumtaz Ali's wife was the first editor of Tehzeeb-e-Niswan and after her death, Mumtaz Ali's daughter Waheeda Begum edited the magazine. It was later edited by Mumtaz Ali's son Imtiaz Ali Taj, and scholarly figures including Abdul Majeed Salik and Ahmad Nadeem Qasmi also edited it.

The magazine helped many female writers gain prominence. In her research work titled Feminism in Modern Urdu Poetesses, Ambreen Salahuddin wrote that "from the very first issue a large number of women started writing for this magazine nearly all of them wrote reformative articles against dowry superstitions or extravagance etc."

According to Gail Minault, Tehzeeb-e-Niswan had 60 or 70 subscribers after three or four months, and after four years it had 300 or 400 subscribers.  
The magazine discontinued in 1949.

Legacy
Commending Mumtaz Ali for Tehzeeb-e-Niswan, Pakistani historian Ghulam Rasool Mehr said that,

References

External links
 19th volume of Tehzeeb-e-Niswan i.e. 1916 issues on Rekhta
 Sayyid Mumtaz Ali and Tehzeeb-e-Niswan: Women's Rights in Islam by Gail Minault.

Islamic magazines
Magazines established in 1898
Magazines disestablished in 1949
Mass media in Lahore
Urdu-language magazines
Weekly magazines published in Pakistan
Women's magazines published in Pakistan
Women's rights